The 4 × 10 kilometre relay cross-country skiing at the 1972 Winter Olympics in Sapporo, Japan was held on Sunday 13 February at the Makomanai Cross Country Events Site. It was the eighth appearance of the 4 × 10 km relay in the Winter Olympics. It was the second time that the Soviet Union won the gold medal in the event. Norway finished second in the relay, Switzerland in third place.

Results
Sources:

References

External links
Results International Ski Federation (FIS)

Men's cross-country skiing at the 1972 Winter Olympics
Men's 4 × 10 kilometre relay cross-country skiing at the Winter Olympics